Nareen Shammo (born 1986 in Bashiqa, Iraq) is a Yazidi investigative journalist and a human rights defender.

Life 
She studied English literature at the Al-Hadba University of Mosul, has worked as a journalist and TV producer for 9 years, and currently campaigns for the rights of Yazidi women.

Activism 
In 2014 Nareen Shammo quit her TV job  when she learnt that Islamic State was systematically kidnapping and enslaving women and girls in Iraq and became active in the liberation of  captive Yazidi girls and women and in denouncing the genocide of Yazidis. She has worked with the Initiative for Ezidis around the world and the Yazda Center.
She has been chosen in 2015 between 100 inspiring women in the world by BBC, and 2016 by Salt and Diageo's.

She was the first to speak out about the abuses against Yazidi women before the Kurdistan Region and call for their intervention.

In 2015, Nareen Shammo was awarded the Clara Zetkin Women's Prize (Clara-Zetkin-Frauenpreis) of the German Die Linke party, for her outstanding work.

References

External links 

1986 births
Living people
Iraqi Yazidis
Women in Iraq
People from Nineveh Governorate
Women human rights activists
BBC 100 Women
Yazidi women